Tetrapterocarpon is a genus of flowering plants in the legume family, Fabaceae. It belongs to the subfamily Caesalpinioideae. It is endemic to Madagascar.

Species
Two species are accepted:
 Tetrapterocarpon geayi Humbert
 Tetrapterocarpon septentrionalis Du Puy & R.Rabev.

References

Caesalpinioideae
Fabaceae genera
Endemic flora of Madagascar